The National Railroad Passenger Corporation, doing business as Amtrak , is the national passenger railroad company of the United States. It operates inter-city rail service in 46 of the 48 contiguous U.S. states and three Canadian provinces. Amtrak is a portmanteau of the words America and trak, the latter itself a sensational spelling of track.

Founded in 1971 as a quasi-public corporation to operate many U.S. passenger rail routes, Amtrak receives a combination of state and federal subsidies but is managed as a for-profit organization. The company's headquarters is located one block west of Union Station in Washington, D.C.

Amtrak's network includes over 500 stations along  of track.

In fiscal year 2022, Amtrak served 22.9 million passengers and had $2.1 billion in revenue, with more than 17,100 employees as of fiscal year 2021. Nearly 87,000 passengers ride more than 300 Amtrak trains daily.

History

Private passenger service
In 1916, 98% of all commercial intercity travelers in the United States moved by rail, and the remaining 2% moved by inland waterways. Nearly 42 million passengers used railways as primary transportation. Passenger trains were owned and operated by the same privately owned companies that operated freight trains. As the 20th century progressed, patronage declined in the face of competition from buses, air travel, and the car. New streamlined diesel-powered trains such as the Pioneer Zephyr were popular with the traveling public but could not reverse the trend. By 1940, railroads held 67 percent of commercial passenger-miles in the United States. In real terms, passenger-miles had fallen by 40% since 1916, from 42 billion to 25 billion.

Traffic surged during World War II, which was aided by troop movement and gasoline rationing. The railroad's market share surged to 74% in 1945, with a massive 94 billion passenger-miles. After the war, railroads rejuvenated their overworked and neglected passenger fleets with fast and luxurious streamliners. These new trains brought only temporary relief to the overall decline. Even as postwar travel exploded, passenger travel percentages of the overall market share fell to 46% by 1950, and then 32% by 1957. The railroads had lost money on passenger service since the Great Depression, but deficits reached $723 million in 1957. For many railroads, these losses threatened financial viability.

The causes of this decline were heavily debated. The National Highway System and airports, both funded by the government, competed directly with the railroads, which paid for their own infrastructure. American car culture was also on the rise in the post-World War II years. Progressive Era rate regulation limited the railroad's ability to turn a profit. Railroads also faced antiquated work rules and inflexible relationships with trade unions. To take one example, workers continued to receive a day's pay for  workdays. Streamliners covered that in two hours.

Matters approached a crisis in the 1960s. The diversion of most United States Post Office Department mail from passenger trains to trucks, airplanes, and freight trains in late 1967 deprived those trains of badly needed revenue. In direct response, the Atchison, Topeka and Santa Fe Railway filed to discontinue 33 of its remaining 39 trains, ending almost all passenger service on one of the largest railroads in the country. The equipment the railroads had ordered after World War II was now 20 years old, worn out, and in need of replacement.

Formation

As passenger service declined, various proposals were brought forward to rescue it. The 1961 Doyle Report proposed that the private railroads pool their services into a single body. Similar proposals were made in 1965 and 1968 but failed to attract support. The federal government passed the High Speed Ground Transportation Act of 1965 to fund pilot programs in the Northeast Corridor, but this did nothing to address passenger deficits. In late 1969, multiple proposals emerged in the United States Congress, including equipment subsidies, route subsidies, and, lastly, a "quasi-public corporation" to take over the operation of intercity passenger trains. Matters were brought to a head on June 21, 1970, when the Penn Central, the largest railroad in the Northeastern United States and teetering on bankruptcy, filed to discontinue 34 of its passenger trains.

In October 1970, Congress passed, and President Richard Nixon signed into law, the Rail Passenger Service Act. Proponents of the bill, led by the National Association of Railroad Passengers (NARP), sought government funding to ensure the continuation of passenger trains. They conceived the National Railroad Passenger Corporation (NRPC), a quasi-public corporation that would be managed as a for-profit organization, but which would receive taxpayer funding and assume operation of intercity passenger trains.

There were several key provisions:
 Any railroad operating intercity passenger service could contract with the NRPC, thereby joining the national system.
 The United States federal government, through the Secretary of Transportation, would own all of the NRPC's issued and outstanding preferred stock. 
 Participating railroads bought into the NRPC using a formula based on their recent intercity passenger losses. The purchase price could be satisfied either by cash or rolling stock; in exchange, the railroads received NRPC common stock.
 Any participating railroad was freed of the obligation to operate intercity passenger service after May 1, 1971, except for those services chosen by the Department of Transportation (DOT) as part of a "basic system" of service and paid for by NRPC using its federal funds.
 Railroads that chose not to join the NRPC system were required to continue operating their existing passenger service until 1975, at which time they could pursue the customary ICC approval process for any discontinuance or alteration to the service.

Of the 26 railroads still offering intercity passenger service in 1970, only six declined to join the NRPC.

The original working brand name for NRPC was Railpax, but less than two weeks before operations began, the official marketing name was changed to Amtrak, a portmanteau of the words America and trak, the latter itself a sensational spelling of track.

Nearly everyone involved expected the experiment to be short-lived. The Nixon administration and many Washington insiders viewed the NRPC as a politically expedient way for the President and Congress to give passenger trains a "last hurrah" as demanded by the public. They expected the NRPC to quietly disappear as public interest waned. After Fortune magazine exposed the manufactured mismanagement in 1974, Louis W. Menk, chairman of the Burlington Northern Railroad, remarked that the story was undermining the scheme to dismantle Amtrak. Proponents also hoped that government intervention would be brief and that Amtrak would soon be able to support itself. Neither view had proved to be correct; for popular support allowed Amtrak to continue in operation longer than critics imagined, while financial results made passenger train service returning to private railroad operations infeasible.

1970s: The Rainbow Era

Amtrak began operations on May 1, 1971. Amtrak received no rail tracks or rights-of-way at its inception. All Amtrak's routes were continuations of prior service, although Amtrak pruned about half the passenger rail network. Of the 366 train routes that operated previously, Amtrak continued only 184. Several major corridors became freight-only, including the ex-New York Central Railroad's Water Level Route from New York to Ohio and Grand Trunk Western Railroad's Chicago to Detroit route. The reduced passenger train schedules created confusion amongst staff. At some stations, Amtrak service was available only late at night or early in the morning, prompting complaints from passengers. Disputes with freight railroads over track usage caused some services to be rerouted, temporarily cancelled, or replaced with buses. On the other hand, the creation of the Los Angeles–Seattle Coast Starlight from three formerly separate train routes was an immediate success, resulting in an increase to daily service by 1973.

Needing to operate only half the train routes that had operated previously, Amtrak would lease around 1,200 of the best passenger cars from the 3,000 that the private railroads owned. All were air-conditioned, and 90% were easy-to-maintain stainless steel. When Amtrak took over, passenger cars and locomotives initially retained the paint schemes and logos of their former owners which resulted in Amtrak running trains with mismatched colors – the "Rainbow Era". In mid-1971, Amtrak began purchasing some of the equipment it had leased, including 286 EMD E and F unit diesel locomotives, 30 GG1 electric locomotives and 1,290 passenger cars. By 1975, the official Amtrak color scheme was painted on most Amtrak equipment and newly purchased locomotives and the rolling stock began appearing.

Amtrak inherited problems with train stations (most notably deferred maintenance) and redundant facilities from the competing railroads that once served the same areas. For example, on the day it started, Amtrak was given the responsibility of rerouting passenger trains from the seven train terminals in Chicago (LaSalle, Dearborn, Grand Central, Randolph, Chicago Northwestern Terminal, Central, and Union) into just one, Union Station. In New York City, Amtrak had to maintain two stations (Penn and Grand Central) due to the lack of track connections to bring trains from upstate New York into Penn Station; a problem that was rectified once the Empire Connection was built in 1991. The Amtrak Standard Stations Program was launched in 1978 and proposed to build a standardized station design across the system with an aim to reduce costs, speed construction, and improve its corporate image. However, the cash-strapped railroad would ultimately build relatively few of these standard stations.

Amtrak soon had the opportunity to acquire rights-of-way. Following the bankruptcy of several northeastern railroads in the early 1970s, including Penn Central, which owned and operated the Northeast Corridor (NEC), Congress passed the Railroad Revitalization and Regulatory Reform Act of 1976. A large part of the legislation was directed to the creation of Conrail, but the law also enabled the transfer of the portions of the NEC not already owned by state authorities to Amtrak. Amtrak acquired the majority of the NEC on April 1, 1976. (The portion in Massachusetts is owned by the Commonwealth and managed by Amtrak. The route from New Haven to New Rochelle is owned by New York's Metropolitan Transportation Authority and the Connecticut Department of Transportation as the New Haven Line.) This mainline became Amtrak's "jewel" asset, and helped the railroad generate revenue. While the NEC ridership and revenues were higher than any other segment of the system, the cost of operating and maintaining the corridor proved to be overwhelming. As a result, Amtrak's federal subsidy was increased dramatically. In subsequent years, other short route segments not needed for freight operations were transferred to Amtrak.

In its first decade, Amtrak fell far short of financial independence, which continues today, but it did find modest success rebuilding trade. Outside factors discouraged competing transport, such as fuel shortages which increased costs of automobile and airline travel, and strikes which disrupted airline operations. Investments in Amtrak's track, equipment and information also made Amtrak more relevant to America's transportation needs. Amtrak's ridership increased from 16.6 million in 1972 to 21 million in 1981.

In February 1978, Amtrak moved its headquarters to 400 N Capitol Street W, Washington D.C.

1980s and 1990s: The Building Era

In 1982, former Secretary of the Navy and retired Southern Railway head William Graham Claytor Jr. came out of retirement to lead Amtrak. During his time at Southern, Claytor was a vocal critic of Amtrak's prior managers, who all came from non-railroading backgrounds. Transportation Secretary Drew Lewis cited this criticism as a reason why the Democrat Claytor was acceptable to the Reagan White House. Despite frequent clashes with the Reagan administration over funding, Claytor enjoyed a good relationship with Lewis, John H. Riley, the head of the Federal Railroad Administration (FRA), and with members of Congress. Limited funding led Claytor to use short-term debt to fund operations.

Building on mechanical developments in the 1970s, high-speed Washington–New York Metroliner Service was improved with new equipment and faster schedules. Travel time between New York and Washington, D.C. was reduced to under 3 hours due to system improvements and limited stop service. This improvement was cited as a reason why Amtrak grew its share of intercity trips between the cities along the corridor. Elsewhere in the country, demand for passenger rail service resulted in the creation of five new state-supported routes in California, Illinois, Missouri, Oregon and Pennsylvania, for a total of 15 state-supported routes.

Amtrak added two trains in 1983, the California Zephyr between Oakland and Chicago via Denver and revived the Auto Train, a unique service that carries both passengers and their vehicles. Amtrak advertised it as a great way to avoid traffic along the I-95 running between Lorton, Virginia (near Washington, D.C.) and Sanford, Florida (near Orlando) on the Silver Star alignment.

In 1980s and 1990s, stations in Baltimore, Chicago, and Washington, D.C. received major rehabilitation and the Empire Connection tunnel opened in 1991, allowing Amtrak to consolidate all New York services at Penn Station. Despite the improvements, Amtrak's ridership stagnated at roughly 20 million passengers per year, amid uncertain government aid from 1981 to about 2000.

In the early 1990s, Amtrak tested several different high-speed trains from Europe on the Northeast Corridor. An X 2000 train was leased from Sweden for test runs from October 1992 to January 1993, followed by revenue service between Washington, D.C. and New York City from February to May and August to September 1993. Siemens showed the ICE 1 train from Germany, organizing the ICE Train North America Tour which started to operate on the Northeast Corridor on July 3, 1993.

In 1993, Thomas Downs succeeded Claytor as Amtrak's fifth president. The stated goal remained "operational self-sufficiency". By this time, however, Amtrak had a large overhang of debt from years of underfunding. In the mid-1990s, Amtrak suffered through a serious cash crunch. Under Downs, Congress included a provision in the Taxpayer Relief Act of 1997 that resulted in Amtrak receiving a $2.3 billion tax refund that resolved their cash crisis. However, Congress also instituted a "glide path" to financial self-sufficiency, excluding railroad retirement tax act payments.

George Warrington became the sixth president in 1998, with a mandate to make Amtrak financially self-sufficient. Under Warrington, the company tried to expand into express freight shipping, placing Amtrak in competition with the "host" freight railroads and the trucking industry.

On March 9, 1999, Amtrak unveiled its plan for the Acela Express, a high-speed train on the Northeast Corridor between Washington, D.C. and Boston. Several changes were made to the corridor to make it suitable for higher-speed electric trains. The Northend Electrification Project extended existing electrification from New Haven, Connecticut, to Boston to complete the overhead power supply along the  route, and several grade crossings were improved or removed.

2000s: Growth in the 21st century

Ridership increased during the first decade of the 21st century after the implementation of capital improvements in the NEC and rises in automobile fuel costs. The inauguration of the high-speed Acela in late 2000 generated considerable publicity and led to major ridership gains. However, through the late 1990s and very early 21st century, Amtrak could not add sufficient express freight revenue or cut sufficient other expenditures to break even. By 2002, it was clear that Amtrak could not achieve self-sufficiency, but Congress continued to authorize funding and released Amtrak from the requirement. In early 2002, David L. Gunn replaced Warrington as seventh president. In a departure from his predecessors' promises to make Amtrak self-sufficient in the short term, Gunn argued that no form of passenger transportation in the United States is self-sufficient as the economy is currently structured. Highways, airports, and air traffic control all require large government expenditures to build and operate, coming from the Highway Trust Fund and Aviation Trust Fund paid for by user fees, highway fuel and road taxes, and, in the case of the General Fund, from general taxation. Gunn dropped most freight express business and worked to eliminate deferred maintenance.

A plan by the Bush administration "to privatize parts of the national passenger rail system and spin off other parts to partial state ownership" provoked disagreement within Amtrak's board of directors. Late in 2005, Gunn was fired. Gunn's replacement, Alexander Kummant (2006–08), was committed to operating a national rail network, and like Gunn, opposed the notion of putting the Northeast Corridor under separate ownership. He said that shedding the system's long-distance routes would amount to selling national assets that are on par with national parks, and that Amtrak's abandonment of these routes would be irreversible. In late 2006, Amtrak unsuccessfully sought annual congressional funding of $1 billion for ten years. In early 2007, Amtrak employed 20,000 people in 46 states and served 25 million passengers a year, its highest amount since its founding in 1970. Politico noted a key problem: "the rail system chronically operates in the red. A pattern has emerged: Congress overrides cutbacks demanded by the White House and appropriates enough funds to keep Amtrak from plunging into insolvency. But, Amtrak advocates say, that is not enough to fix the system's woes."

Joseph H. Boardman replaced Kummant as president and CEO in late 2008.

In 2011, Amtrak announced its intention to improve and expand the high-speed rail corridor from Penn Station in NYC, under the Hudson River in new tunnels, and double-tracking the line to Newark, NJ, called the Gateway Program, initially estimated to cost $13.5 billion (equal to $ billion in ).

From May 2011 to May 2012, Amtrak celebrated its 40th anniversary with festivities across the country that started on National Train Day (May 7, 2011). A commemorative book entitled Amtrak: An American Story was published, a documentary was created, six locomotives were painted in Amtrak's four prior paint schemes, and an Exhibit Train toured the country visiting 45 communities and welcoming more than 85,000 visitors.

After years of almost revolving-door CEOs at Amtrak, in December 2013, Boardman was named "Railroader of the Year" by Railway Age magazine, which noted that with over five years in the job, he is the second-longest serving head of Amtrak since it was formed more than 40 years ago. On December 9, 2015, Boardman announced in a letter to employees that he would be leaving Amtrak in September 2016. He had advised the Amtrak Board of Directors of his decision the previous week. On August 19, 2016, the Amtrak Board of Directors named former Norfolk Southern Railway President & CEO Charles "Wick" Moorman as Boardman's successor with an effective date of September 1, 2016. During his term, Moorman took no salary and said that he saw his role as one of a "transitional CEO" who would reorganize Amtrak before turning it over to new leadership.

On November 17, 2016, the Gateway Program Development Corporation (GDC) was formed for the purpose of overseeing and effectuating the rail infrastructure improvements known as the Gateway Program. GDC is a partnership of the States of New York and New Jersey and Amtrak. The Gateway Program includes the Hudson Tunnel Project, to build a new tunnel under the Hudson River and rehabilitate the existing century-old tunnel, and the Portal North Bridge, to replace a century-old moveable bridge with a modern structure that is less prone to failure. Later projects of the Gateway Program, including the expansion of track and platforms at Penn Station New York, construction of the Bergen Loop and other improvements will roughly double capacity for Amtrak and NJ Transit trains in the busiest, most complex section of the Northeast Corridor.

In June 2017, it was announced that former Delta and Northwest Airlines CEO Richard Anderson would become Amtrak's next President & CEO. Anderson began the job on July 12, assuming the title of President immediately and serving alongside Moorman as "co-CEOs" until the end of the year. On April 15, 2020, Atlas Air Chairman, President and CEO William Flynn was named Amtrak President and CEO. In addition to Atlas Air, Flynn has held senior roles at CSX Transportation, SeaLand Services and GeoLogistics Corp. Anderson would remain with Amtrak as a senior advisor until December 2020.

As Amtrak approached profitability in 2020, the company undertook planning to expand and create new intermediate-distance corridors across the country. Included were several new services in Ohio, Tennessee, Colorado, and Minnesota, among other states.

During the COVID-19 pandemic, Amtrak continued operating as an essential service. It started requiring face coverings the week of May 17, and limited sales to 50% of capacity. Most long-distance routes were reduced to three weekly round trips in October 2020.

In March 2021, following President Joe Biden's American Jobs Plan announcement, Amtrak CEO Bill Flynn outlined a proposal called Amtrak Connects US that would expand state-supported intercity corridors with an infusion of upfront capital assistance. This would expand service to cities including Las Vegas, Phoenix, Baton Rouge, Nashville, Chattanooga, Louisville, Columbus (Ohio), Wilmington (North Carolina), Cheyenne, Montgomery, Concord, and Scranton. Also in March 2021, Amtrak announced plans to return 12 of its long-distance routes to daily schedules later in the spring. Most of these routes were restored to daily service in late-May 2021. However, a resurgence of the virus caused by the Omicron variant caused Amtrak to modify and/or suspend many of these routes again from January to March 2022.

Operations

Routes

Amtrak is required by law to operate a national route system. Amtrak has presence in 46 of the 48 contiguous states, as well as the District of Columbia (with only thruway connecting services in Wyoming and no services in South Dakota). Amtrak services fall into three groups: short-haul service on the Northeast Corridor, state-supported short-haul service outside the Northeast Corridor, and medium- and long-haul service known within Amtrak as the National Network. Amtrak receives federal funding for the vast majority of its operations including the central spine of the Northeast Corridor as well as for its National Network routes. In addition to the federally funded routes, Amtrak partners with transportation agencies in 18 states to operate other short and medium-haul routes outside of the Northeast Corridor, some of which connect to it or are extensions from it. In addition to its inter-city services, Amtrak also operates commuter services under contract for three public agencies: the MARC Penn Line in Maryland, Shore Line East in Connecticut, and Metrolink in Southern California.

Service on the Northeast Corridor (NEC), between Boston, and Washington, D.C., as well as between Philadelphia and Harrisburg, is powered by overhead lines; for the rest of the system, diesel-fueled locomotives are used. Routes vary widely in the frequency of service, from three-days-a-week trains on the Sunset Limited to several times per hour on the Northeast Corridor. For areas not served by trains, Amtrak Thruway routes provide guaranteed connections to trains via buses, vans, ferries and other modes.

The most popular and heavily used services are those running on the NEC, including the Acela and Northeast Regional. The NEC runs between Boston and Washington, D.C. via New York City and Philadelphia. Some services continue into Virginia. The NEC services accounted for 4.4 million of Amtrak's 12.2 million passengers in fiscal year 2021. Outside the NEC the most popular services are the short-haul corridors in California, the Pacific Surfliner, Capitol Corridor, and San Joaquin, which are supplemented by an extensive network of connecting buses. Together the California corridor trains accounted for a combined 2.35 million passengers in fiscal year 2021. Other popular routes include the Empire Service between New York City and Niagara Falls, via Albany and Buffalo, which carried 613.2 thousand passengers in fiscal year 2021, and the Keystone Service between New York City and Harrisburg via Philadelphia that carried 394.3 thousand passengers that same year.

Four of the six busiest stations by boardings are on the NEC: New York Penn Station (first), Washington Union Station (second), Philadelphia 30th Street Station (third), and Boston South Station (fifth). The other two are Chicago Union Station (fourth) and Los Angeles Union Station (sixth).

On-time performance
On-time performance is calculated differently for airlines than for Amtrak. A plane is considered on-time if it arrives within 15 minutes of the schedule.

Outside the Northeast Corridor and stretches of track in Southern California and Michigan, most Amtrak trains run on tracks owned and operated by privately owned freight railroads. BNSF is the largest host to Amtrak routes, with 6.3 million miles. Freight rail operators are required under federal law to give dispatching preference to Amtrak trains. However, Amtrak has accused freight railroads violating or skirting these regulations, resulting in passenger trains waiting for freight traffic to clear the track.

The railroads' dispatching practices were investigated in 2008, resulting in stricter laws about train priority. Subsequently, Amtrak's overall on-time performance went up from 74.7% in fiscal 2008 to 84.7% in 2009, with long-distance trains and others outside the NEC seeing the greatest benefit. The Missouri River Runner jumped from 11% to 95%, becoming one of Amtrak's best performers. The Texas Eagle went from 22.4% to 96.7%, and the California Zephyr, with a 5% on-time record in 2008, went up to 78.3%. However, this improved performance coincided with a general economic downturn, resulting in the lowest freight-rail traffic volumes since at least 1988, meaning less freight traffic to impede passenger traffic.

In 2018, Amtrak began issuing report cards, grading each host railroad similar to students, based on the railroad's impact to on-time performance. The first report card, issued in March 2018, includes one A (given to Canadian Pacific) and two Fs (given to Canadian National and Norfolk Southern). Amtrak's 2020 host report card gives Canadian Pacific and Canadian National an A, BNSF and CSX a B, Union Pacific a C+, and Norfolk Southern a D-.

Ridership

Amtrak carried 15.8 million passengers in 1972, its first full year of operation. Ridership has increased steadily ever since, carrying a record 32 million passengers in fiscal year 2019, more than double the total in 1972. For the fiscal year ending on September 30, 2020, Amtrak reported 16.8 million passengers, with the decline resulting from effects of the COVID-19 pandemic. Fiscal year 2021 saw ridership decrease more, with 12.2 million passengers reported. Fiscal year 2022 saw an increase to 22.9 million passengers, however, it is still lower than pre-pandemic numbers.

Guest Rewards
Amtrak's loyalty program, Guest Rewards, is similar to the frequent-flyer programs of many airlines. Guest Rewards members accumulate points by riding Amtrak and through other activities, and can redeem these points for free Amtrak tickets and other rewards.

Rail passes 
Amtrak offers rail passes, which can be cheaper than air travel for long distances, and allows side trips without extra charge.

Lines

In several places, primarily in New England, Amtrak leases tracks, providing track maintenance and controlling train movements. Most often, these tracks are leased from state, regional, or local governments. The lines are further divided into services. Amtrak owns and operates the following lines:

 Northeast Corridor: the Northeast Corridor between Washington, D.C., and Boston via Baltimore, Philadelphia, Newark, New York and Providence is largely owned by Amtrak (363 of 457 miles), working cooperatively with several state and regional commuter agencies. Between New Haven, Connecticut, and New Rochelle, New York, Northeast Corridor trains travel on the Metro-North Railroad's New Haven Line, which is owned and operated by the Connecticut Department of Transportation and the Metropolitan Transportation Authority.
 Keystone Corridor: Amtrak owns the 104.2-mile line from Philadelphia to Harrisburg, Pennsylvania.
In addition, Amtrak owns the tracks across the Whirlpool Rapids Bridge and short approach sections near it.
 Michigan Line: Amtrak acquired the 98 miles of Porter, Indiana to Kalamazoo, Michigan section of the former Michigan Central main line from Conrail in 1976.
 Post Road Branch: , Castleton-on-Hudson to Rensselaer, New York

In addition to these lines, Amtrak owns station and yard tracks in Chicago, Los Angeles, New Orleans, New York City, Oakland (Kirkham Street Yard), Orlando, Portland, Oregon, Seattle, Philadelphia, and Washington, D.C. Amtrak leases station and yard tracks in Hialeah, near Miami, Florida, from the State of Florida.

Amtrak owns New York Penn Station, Philadelphia 30th Street Station, Baltimore Penn Station and Providence Station. It also owns Chicago Union Station, formerly through a wholly owned subsidiary, the Chicago Union Station Company until absorbed by Amtrak in 2017. Through the Washington Terminal Company, in which it owns a 99.7 percent interest, it owns the rail infrastructure around Washington Union Station. It holds a 99% interest in 30th Street Limited, a partnership responsible for redeveloping the area in and around 30th Street Station. Amtrak also owns Passenger Railroad Insurance.

Service lines 
Amtrak organizes its business into six "service lines", which are treated like divisions at most companies.

There are three operating service lines: Northeast Corridor, which operates Amtrak's high-speed Acela and Northeast Regional trains; State Supported, which provides service on corridor routes of less than 750 miles through cost-sharing agreements with state governments; and Long Distance, which operates routes over 750 miles and receives financial support from the federal government.

Additionally there are three service lines involved in activities other than operating Amtrak trains. They are: Ancillary, which includes operating commuter trains under contract, establishing Amtrak Thruway connecting services, operating charter trains, and hauling private railcars; Real Estate & Commercial which manages property owned by Amtrak, including leasing space to other businesses inside stations; and Infrastructure Access/Reimbursable which charges other railroads for access to Amtrak owned tracks and performs work that can be reimbursed by other railroads or state governments. Net revenue generated by these service lines is used to fund Amtrak's other operations.

Rolling stock

Amtrak owns 2,142 railway cars and 425 locomotives for revenue runs and service, collectively called rolling stock. Notable examples include the GE Genesis and Siemens Charger diesel locomotives, the Siemens ACS-64 electric locomotive, the Amfleet series of single-level passenger cars, and the Superliner series of double-decker passenger cars.

The railroad is currently working to replace its fleet, spending $2.4 billion on 28 Avelia Liberty trainsets for its flagship Acela service and $7.3 billion for 65 Airo trainsets for other Northeast Corridor services. Additionally, California, North Carolina, and a group of Midwestern states purchased Siemens Venture trainsets for use on routes operated by Amtrak in their states, which started entering service in 2022. In 2023, Amtrak announced it had made a request for proposals, looking to replace hundreds of railcars used on long-distance routes.

On-board services

Classes of service

Amtrak offers four classes of service: First Class, Sleeper Service, Business Class, and Coach Class:
 First Class: First Class service is only offered on the Acela. Seats are larger than those of Business Class and come in a variety of seating styles (single, facing singles with table, double, facing doubles with table and wheelchair accessible). First Class is located in a separate car from business class and is located at the end of the train (to reduce the number of passengers walking in the aisles). A car attendant provides passengers with hot towel service, a complimentary meal and alcoholic beverages. First Class passengers have access to lounges located at most larger stations.
 Sleeper Service: Private room accommodations on long-distance trains, including roomettes, bedrooms, bedroom suites, accessible bedrooms, and, on some trains, family bedrooms. Included in the price of a room are attendant service and on most routes, full hot meals. At night, attendants convert rooms into sleeping areas with fold-down beds and linens. Shower facilities with towels and bar soap are available. Complimentary juice, coffee and bottled water are included as well. Sleeper car passengers have access to all passenger facilities aboard the train. Sleeper Service passengers have access to lounges located at select stations.
 Business Class: Business Class seating is offered on the Acela, Northeast Regional, many short-haul corridor trains and some long-distance trains. It is the standard class of service on the Acela. On all other trains where it is offered, Business Class is located in a dedicated car or section of the train. While the specific features vary by route, many include extra legroom and complimentary non-alcoholic drinks. Seats in business class recline and feature a fold-down tray table, footrest, individual reading light, and power outlet. Passengers have access to some lounges, but busier locations may exclude Business Class customers.
 Coach Class: Coach Class is the standard class of service on all Amtrak trains except the Acela. Seats in coach recline and feature a fold-down tray table, footrest, individual reading light, and power outlet. Coach cars on long-distance trains are configured with fewer seats per car so that passengers have additional legroom and seats which are equipped with leg rests.

Wi-Fi and electronic services
Amtrak first offered free Wi-Fi service to passengers aboard the Downeaster in 2008, the Acela and the Northeast Regional trains on the NEC in 2010, and the Amtrak Cascades in 2011. In February 2014, Amtrak rolled out Wi-Fi on corridor trains out of Chicago. When all the Midwest cars offer the AmtrakConnect service, about 85% of all Amtrak passengers nationwide will have Wi-Fi access. , most Amtrak passengers have access to free Wi-Fi. The service has developed a reputation for being unreliable and slow due to its cellular network connection; on some routes it is usually unusable, either freezing on the login page or, if it manages to log in, failing to provide any internet bandwidth.

Amtrak launched an e-ticketing system on the Downeaster in November 2011 and rolled it out nationwide on July 30, 2012. Amtrak officials said the system gives "more accurate knowledge in realtime of who is on the train which greatly improves the safety and security of passengers; en route reporting of onboard equipment problems to mechanical crews which may result in faster resolution of the issue; and more efficient financial reporting".

Baggage and cargo services

Amtrak allows carry-on baggage on all routes; services with baggage cars allow checked baggage at selected stations. With the passage of the Wicker Amendment in 2010 passengers are allowed to put lawfully owned, unloaded firearms in checked Amtrak baggage, reversing a decade-long ban on such carriage.

The Amtrak Express cargo service provides small-package and less-than-truckload shipping between most Amtrak stations that handle checked baggage (over 100 cities). Cargo travels alongside checked luggage in baggage cars. Service and hours vary by station, limited by available equipment and staffing. Nearly all stations with checked baggage service can handle small packages, while large stations with forklifts can handle palletized shipments. Amtrak Express also offers station-to-station shipment of human remains to many cities.

Amtrak is popular among bicycle touring enthusiasts due to the ease of riding with a bike. In contrast to airlines, which require riders to dismantle their bicycles and place them in specialized bags, most Amtrak trains have onboard bike racks in either the coaches or checked baggage car. Bicycle reservations are required on most routes and cost up to $20.

Labor issues
In the modern era, Amtrak faces a number of important labor issues. In the area of pension funding, because of limitations originally imposed by Congress, most Amtrak workers were traditionally classified as "railroad employees" and contributions to the Railroad Retirement system have been made for those employees. However, because the size of the contributions is determined on an industry-wide basis rather than with reference to the employer for whom the employees work, some critics, such as the National Association of Railroad Passengers, maintain that Amtrak is subsidizing freight railroad pensions by as much as US$150 million/year.

In recent times, efforts at reforming passenger rail have addressed labor issues. In 1997 Congress released Amtrak from a prohibition on contracting for labor outside the corporation (and outside its unions), opening the door to privatization. Since that time, many of Amtrak's employees have been working without a contract. The most recent contract, signed in 1999, was mainly retroactive.

Because of the fragmentation of railroad unions by job,  Amtrak has 14 separate unions to negotiate with. Plus, it has 24 separate contracts with those unions. This makes it difficult to make substantial changes, in contrast to a situation where one union negotiates with one employer. Former Amtrak president Kummant followed a cooperative posture with Amtrak's trade unions, ruling out plans to privatize large parts of Amtrak's unionized workforce.

Environmental impacts

Amtrak's environmental impact 
Per passenger mile, Amtrak is 30–40 percent more energy-efficient than commercial airlines and automobiles overall, though the exact figures for particular routes depend on load factor along with other variables. The electrified trains in the NEC are considerably more efficient than Amtrak's diesels and can feed energy captured from regenerative braking back to the electrical grid. Passenger rail is also very competitive with other modes in terms of safety per mile.

In 2005, Amtrak's carbon dioxide equivalent emissions were 0.411 lbs/mi (0.116 kg per km). For comparison, this is similar to a car with two people, about twice as high as the UK rail average (where more of the system is electrified), about four times the average US motorcoach, and about eight times a Finnish electric intercity train or fully loaded fifty-seat coach. It is, however, about two thirds of the raw CO2-equivalent emissions of a long-distance domestic flight.

Amtrak operates over thirty passenger train routes throughout the U.S. and Canada. According to a 2009 UK study, rail transport on passenger trains produces significantly less greenhouse gas emissions per unit distance than both road transport and domestic air transport in the UK.

Amtrak operates diesel, electric, and dual-mode (diesel and electric) locomotives. Diesel-powered engines produce more greenhouse gas emissions during operation than electric trains.

As for the locational pollution directly from Amtrak operation, their diesel trains cause more regional air pollution, impacting the ecosystems around the sites of operation. Also, more stops along train routes can lead to higher greenhouse gas emissions. Amtrak rail facilities located in Delaware were cited as the state's largest source of polychlorinated biphenyl (PCB) contamination into the Delaware River, which build up in the tissue of animals and are human carcinogens.

Environmental impact on Amtrak 
Amtrak railways and surrounding infrastructure are susceptible to degradation by natural causes over time. Railways experience water damage from climate change backed increases in rainfall in wet areas, and rail buckling caused by hotter and dryer seasons in naturally dry areas.

Hurricane Ida flooded the Amtrak Northeast Corridor running from Boston to Washington D.C. and caused it to shut down for an entire day. In February 2023, heavy snowfall and debris on tracks caused major disruptions from delays to cancellations.

Rising summertime temperatures are causing an increase in railway buckles. A study conducted on the railways in the southeast United Kingdom found that when temperature changes become extreme in the summertime due to climate change, the tracks buckle due to the outward force of the metal expanding in collaboration with the weight of train car traffic. This causes speed restrictions to be put in place around certain temperature intervals, slowing travel time and lessening the amount of train rides in a day. The study found that in 2004, 30,000 delay minutes were attributed to increased heat causing a total of over 1.7 million U.S. dollars, of total heat related delay cost.

Public funding
Amtrak receives annual appropriations from federal and state governments to supplement operating and capital programs.

Funding history

1970s to 1990s
Amtrak commenced operations in 1971 with $40 million in direct federal aid, $100 million in federally insured loans, and a somewhat larger private contribution. Officials expected that Amtrak would break even by 1974, but those expectations proved unrealistic and annual direct federal aid reached a 17-year high in 1981 of $1.25 billion. During the Reagan administration, appropriations were halved and by 1986, federal support fell to a decade low of $601 million, almost none of which were capital appropriations. In the late 1980s and early 1990s, Congress continued the reductionist trend even while Amtrak expenses held steady or rose. Amtrak was forced to borrow to meet short-term operating needs, and by 1995 Amtrak was on the brink of a cash crisis and was unable to continue to service its debts. In response, in 1997 Congress authorized $5.2 billion for Amtrak over the next five years – largely to complete the Acela capital project – on the condition that Amtrak submit to the ultimatum of self-sufficiency by 2003 or liquidation. While Amtrak made financial improvements during this period, it did not achieve self-sufficiency.

2000s

In 2004, a stalemate in federal support of Amtrak forced cutbacks in services and routes as well as the resumption of deferred maintenance. In fiscal 2004 and 2005, Congress appropriated about $1.2 billion for Amtrak, $300 million more than President George W. Bush had requested. However, the company's board requested $1.8 billion through fiscal 2006, the majority of which (about $1.3 billion) would be used to bring infrastructure, rolling stock, and motive power back to a state of good repair. In Congressional testimony, the DOT Inspector General confirmed that Amtrak would need at least $1.4 billion to $1.5 billion in fiscal 2006 and $2 billion in fiscal 2007 just to maintain the status quo. In 2006, Amtrak received just under $1.4 billion, with the condition that Amtrak would reduce (but not eliminate) food and sleeper service losses. Thus, dining service was simplified and now requires two fewer on-board service workers. Only Auto Train and Empire Builder services continue regular made-on-board meal service. In 2010 the Senate approved a bill to provide $1.96 billion to Amtrak, but cut the approval for high-speed rail to a $1 billion appropriation.

State governments have partially filled the breach left by reductions in federal aid. Several states have entered into operating partnerships with Amtrak, notably California, Pennsylvania, Illinois, Michigan, Oregon, Missouri, Washington, North Carolina, Oklahoma, Texas, Wisconsin, Vermont, Maine, and New York, as well as the Canadian province of British Columbia, which provides some of the resources for the operation of the Cascades route.

With the dramatic rise in gasoline prices during 2007–08, Amtrak saw record ridership. Capping a steady five-year increase in ridership overall, regional lines saw 12% year-over-year growth in May 2008. In October 2007, the Senate passed S-294, Passenger Rail Improvement and Investment Act of 2007 (70–22) sponsored by Senators Frank Lautenberg and Trent Lott. Despite a veto threat by President Bush, a similar bill passed the House on June 11, 2008, with a veto-proof margin (311–104). The final bill, spurred on by the September 12 Metrolink collision in California and retitled Passenger Rail Investment and Improvement Act of 2008, was signed into law by President Bush on October 16, 2008. The bill appropriates $2.6 billion a year in Amtrak funding through 2013.

2010s
Amtrak points out that in 2010, its farebox recovery (percentage of operating costs covered by revenues generated by passenger fares) was 79%, the highest reported for any U.S. passenger railroad. This increased to 94.9% in 2018.

Amtrak has argued that it needs to increase capital program costs in 2013 in order to replace old train equipment because the multi-year maintenance costs for those trains exceed what it would cost to simply buy new equipment that would not need to be repaired for several years. However, despite an initial request for more than $2.1 billion in funding for the year, the company had to deal with a year-over-year cut in 2013 federal appropriations, dropping to under $1.4 billion for the first time in several years. Amtrak stated in 2010 that the backlog of needed repairs of the track it owns on the Northeast Corridor included over 200 bridges, most dating to the 19th century, tunnels under Baltimore dating to the American Civil War era and functionally obsolete track switches which would cost $5.2 billion to repair (more than triple Amtrak's total annual budget). Amtrak's budget is only allocated on a yearly basis, and it has been argued by Joseph Vranich that this makes multi-year development programs and long-term fiscal planning difficult if not impossible.

In Fiscal Year 2011, the U.S. Congress granted Amtrak $563 million for operating and $922 million for capital programs.

Controversy
Government aid to Amtrak was controversial from the beginning. The formation of Amtrak in 1971 was criticized as a bailout serving corporate rail interests and union railroaders, not the traveling public. Critics have asserted that Amtrak has proven incapable of operating as a business and that it does not provide valuable transportation services meriting public support, a "mobile money-burning machine". Many fiscal conservatives have argued that subsidies should be ended, national rail service terminated, and the NEC turned over to private interests. "To fund a Nostalgia Limited is not in the public interest." Critics also question Amtrak's energy efficiency, though the U.S. Department of Energy considers Amtrak among the most energy-efficient forms of transportation.

The Rail Passenger Service Act of 1970, which established Amtrak, specifically states that, "The Corporation will not be an agency or establishment of the United States Government". Then common stock was issued in 1971 to railroads that contributed capital and equipment; these shares convey almost no benefits, but their holders declined a 2002 buy-out offer by Amtrak. There are currently 109,396,994 shares of preferred stock, at a par value of $100 per share, all held by the US government. There are 9,385,694 shares of common stock, with a par value of $10 per share, held by four other railroad companies: APU (formerly Penn Central) 53%, BNSF (35%), Canadian Pacific (7%), and Canadian National (5%).

Incidents

The following are major accidents and incidents that involved Amtrak trains:

After settling for $17 million in the 2017 Washington state train crash, to prevent further lawsuits, the board adopted a new policy requiring arbitration.

See also

Topics dealing with Amtrak
 Amtrak Arrow Reservation System
 Amtrak paint schemes
 Amtrak Police Department
 Amtrak Standard Stations Program
 Beech Grove Shops
 History of rail transport in the United States
 List of Amtrak stations
 Positive train control
 Visible Intermodal Prevention and Response team (VIPR) – TSA's rail security operations
 Railway electrification system

Other railway companies
 Auto-Train Corporation – Pioneer of car-on-train service
 Via Rail (Canada) - connects with Amtrak
 List of railway companies

Notes

Explanatory citations

Citations

References

Further reading

External links

 
 Amtrak - Historical Timeline
 Amtrak - Great American Stations
 Amtrak Connects US - official website outlining 15-year expansion plans
 All Aboard Amtrak! 50 Years of America's Railroad - digital exhibit from Northwestern University's Transportation Library for Amtrak's 50th anniversary
 The Museum of Railway Timetables (Amtrak timetables from 1971 to 2016)

 
1971 establishments in the United States
Alabama railroads
Arizona railroads
Arkansas railroads
British Columbia railways
California railroads
Class I railroads in North America
Colorado railroads
Connecticut railroads
Delaware railroads
Electric railways in the United States
Florida railroads
Georgia (U.S. state) railroads
Government-owned railway companies
Government-owned companies of the United States
Idaho railroads
Indiana railroads
Iowa railroads
Kansas railroads
Kentucky railroads
Louisiana railroads
Maine railroads
Maryland railroads
Massachusetts railroads
Michigan railroads
Minnesota railroads
Mississippi railroads
Missouri railroads
Montana railroads
Nebraska railroads
Nevada railroads
New Hampshire railroads
New Jersey railroads
New Mexico railroads
New York (state) railroads
North Carolina railroads
North Dakota railroads
Ohio railroads
Oklahoma railroads
Ontario railways
Oregon railroads
Passenger rail transportation in the United States
Passenger railroads in the United States
Pennsylvania railroads
Quebec railways
Railroads in the Chicago metropolitan area
Railway companies established in 1971
Rhode Island railroads
South Carolina railroads
Tennessee railroads
Texas railroads
Utah railroads
Vermont railroads
Virginia railroads
Washington (state) railroads
Washington, D.C., railroads
West Virginia railroads
Wisconsin railroads
Corporations chartered by the United States Congress
Illinois railroads